The Circuit des Invalides was a street circuit located around Les Invalides in Paris, France. It was used for the Paris ePrix of the single-seater, electrically powered Formula E championship. It was first used on 23 April 2016 for the 2016 Paris ePrix.

Layout

It went clock-wise around Les Invalides with the Musée de l'Armée and the tomb of Napoleon. The pit lane was located along the Esplanade des Invalides, north of Les Invalides. It was characterised by a slippery surface, and a short section at turn 3 with new tarmac temporarily placed over the cobblestones.

Lap records 

The official race lap records at the Paris Street Circuit are listed as:

Notes

References

Formula E circuits
Paris ePrix
Defunct motorsport venues in France
Sports venues in Paris